The Commission of Audit (CA;) is the auditor for the government of Macau to aid accountability by conducting independent audits of the government operations. The office has similar functions to auditors in other jurisdictions, but the Commissioner reports directly to the Chief Executive of Macau, not to Legislative Council of Macau and therefore lacks independence from political interference.

A list of commissioners:

 Fátima Choi Mei Lei 1999-2009
 Ho Veng On 2009–Present

See also

 Auditor General of Canada 
 Director of Audit 
 Inspector General

References

External links
Organization Chart of the MSAR

Positions of the Macau Government
Macau